Sepp Rist (24 February 1900 – 11 December 1980) was a German film actor. In WW1 he served in the Imperial German Navy. He was married to the actress Carla Rust.

Partial filmography

 Storm over Mont Blanc (1930) - Hannes
 S.O.S. Eisberg (1933) - Dr. Johannes Krafft / Dr. Johannes Brand
 The Champion of Pontresina (1934) - Uli Boeker - Mannschaftsführer
 The Riders of German East Africa (1934) - Deutscher Farmer Peter Hellhoff / Hauptmann der Reserve
 The Eternal Dream (1934) - Jacques Balmat
 Rêve éternel (1935) - Jacques Balmat
 The Traitor (1936) - Commissioner Kilian
 Der lachende Dritte (1936) - Sepp
 Kokumin no chikai (1938, i.e. The Oath of the People, German-Japanese co-production by Hiromasa Nomura; released in Nazi Germany as "Das heilige Ziel" in February 1942)
 Der rettende Engel (1940)
 Krambambuli (1940) - Barthel Raunegger, Jäger
 The Vulture Wally (1940) - Joseph Brandl, der "Bärenjoseph"
 Die Erbin vom Rosenhof (1942) - Sepp Vöstl
 The Rainer Case (1942) - Hauptmann Leopold Lechner
 Kohlhiesel's Daughters (1943) - Kaspar Pointer
 Titanic (1943) - Jan
 Der Erbförster (1945)
 Border Post 58 (1951) - Sepp
 Valentins Sündenfall (1951) - Christian
 The Devil Makes Three (1952) - Customs Official - German
 The Crucifix Carver of Ammergau (1952) - Jäger
 The Village Under the Sky (1953) - Vincenz, Dorfwirt
 The Poacher (1953) - Oberjäger Kurzinger
 Love and Trumpets (1954)
 Der erste Kuß (1954)
 The Beautiful Miller (1954) - Kriminalinspektor
 Schützenliesel (1954)
 Operation Edelweiss (1954) - Magnus Rasmussen
 Doctor Solm (1955) - Bauer Dinkelsbacher
The Blacksmith of St. Bartholomae (1955) - Gend.-Inspektor
 As Long as You Live (1955) - Pepe
 Where the Ancient Forests Rustle (1956)
 Die schöne Meisterin (1956)
 Die Magd von Heiligenblut (1956) - Pfarrer von Heiligenblut
 Der Adler vom Velsatal (1957) - Forester Strobl
 Wer die Heimat liebt (1957) - Anton Graspointner, Bauer
 War of the Maidens (1957) - Feldhofer, Großbauer
 The King of Bernina (1957) - Vater Gruber
 Jägerblut (1957)
 Nackt, wie Gott sie schuf (1958)
 Heiße Ware (1959) - Gruber - Grenz-Kommissar
 Mein Vaterhaus steht in den Bergen (1960) - Rudolf Liebmann
 Three Men in a Boat (1961) - Guggemos
 Waldrausch (1962) - Der Mann von Kaprun
 Die schwedische Jungfrau (1965) - Oberwachtmeister (uncredited)
 Da lacht Tirol (1967) - Much
 When Ludwig Goes on Manoeuvres (1967) - Colonel von der Tann
 Hubertus Castle (1973) - Der alte Mühltaler
 The Hunter of Fall (1974) - Der alte Huisen (final film role)

References

Bibliography
 Goble, Alan. The Complete Index to Literary Sources in Film. Walter de Gruyter, 1999.

External links

1900 births
1980 deaths
German male film actors
People from Oberallgäu